This is a list of earthquakes in 1966. Only magnitude 6.0 or greater earthquakes appear on the list. Lower magnitude events are included if they have caused death, injury or damage. Events which occurred in remote areas will be excluded from the list as they wouldn't have generated significant media interest. All dates are listed according to UTC time. Maximum intensities are indicated on the Mercalli intensity scale and are sourced from United States Geological Survey (USGS) ShakeMap data. With only 9 events above magnitude 7.0+ this was a fairly quiet year. The largest event was in Peru in October and measured 8.1. Turkey had the deadliest event of the year when in August a magnitude 6.8 earthquake caused nearly 2,400 deaths. China had a number of deadly earthquakes especially in March. DR Congo also had an earthquake in March which resulted in 140 deaths. Japan and large portions of Indonesia were notably quiet this year.

Overall

By death toll 

 Note: At least 10 casualties

By magnitude 

 Note: At least 7.0 magnitude

Notable events

January

February

March

April

May

June

July

August

September

October

November

December

References

1966
 
1966